Sunday Dinner for a Soldier is a 1944 American drama romance war film directed by Lloyd Bacon and starring Anne Baxter and John Hodiak. It is based on a novelette by Martha Cheavens.

Plot
A poor family in Florida saves all the money they can in order to plan a Sunday dinner for a soldier at a local Army airbase. They don't realize that their request to invite the soldier never got mailed. On the day of the scheduled dinner, another soldier is brought to their home and love soon blossoms between him (Hodiak) and Tessa (Baxter), the young woman who runs the home.

Cast
Anne Baxter - Tessa
John Hodiak - Eric Moore
Charles Winninger - Grandfather
Anne Revere - Agatha
Chill Wills - Mr. York
Robert Bailey - Kenneth Normand
Bobby Driscoll - Jeep
Jane Darwell - Mrs. Dobson

Radio adaptation
On February 19, 1945, Baxter, Hodiak, and Winninger appeared in a radio adaptation of the film on Lux Radio Theatre.

References

"The Screen; Crisis and Romance", The New York Times (January 25, 1945)

External links
 
Turner Classic Movies listing

1944 films
1940s war drama films
20th Century Fox films
American war drama films
American black-and-white films
Films scored by Alfred Newman
Films based on short fiction
Films directed by Lloyd Bacon
Films set in Florida
Films set on the home front during World War II
World War II films made in wartime
Films with screenplays by Wanda Tuchock
1944 drama films
1940s English-language films